Down to Earth is a 1932 American pre-Code comedy film directed by David Butler and starring Will Rogers, Dorothy Jordan and Irene Rich. It is a sequel to the 1929 film They Had to See Paris, with the Peters family returning to America where their wealthy lifestyle is suddenly hit by the Great Depression.

Main cast
 Will Rogers as Pike Peters 
 Dorothy Jordan as Julia Pearson  
 Irene Rich as Idy Peters  
 Matty Kemp as Ross Peters 
 Mary Carlisle as Jackie Harper  
 Brandon Hurst as Jeffrey, the Butler 
 Theodore Lodi as Grand Duke Michael  
 Clarence Wilson as Ed Eggers

References

Bibliography
 Bryan B. Sterling. Will Rogers in Hollywood. Crown Publishers, 1984.

External links
 
 

1932 films
1932 comedy films
American comedy films
Fox Film films
Films directed by David Butler
American sequel films
American black-and-white films
1930s English-language films
1930s American films